The Young Arsonists is a Canadian drama film, directed by Sheila Pye and slated for release in 2022. The film centres on four teenage girls who form an intense and obsessive bond when they discover and reclaim an abandoned farmhouse.

The film stars Maddy Martin as Nicole, Jenna Warren as Veronica, Sadie Rose as Amber and Madison Baines as Sara. Its supporting cast also includes Aaron Poole, Miranda Calderon, Joe Bostick, Kyle Meagher and Measha Brueggergosman.

The film was shot in fall 2021 in Caledonia, Ontario.

The film premiered in the Discovery program at the 2022 Toronto International Film Festival on September 11, 2022.

References

External links

2020s Canadian films
2020s English-language films
2022 drama films
2022 films
Canadian drama films
English-language Canadian films
Films shot in Ontario